The Men's 30 kilometre pursuit competition at the FIS Nordic World Ski Championships 2019 will be held on 23 February 2019.

Results
The race was started at 12:30.

References

Men's 30 kilometre pursuit